The Trucks was an electronic rock band originally formed in Bellingham, Washington. It was founded in 2003, to fill a lack of female bands for a festival, by Kristin Allen-Zito, Faith Reichel, and Marissa Moore, and later added Lindy McIntyre (formerly of Everybody's Debbie) on drums. The Trucks went on to become a popular band in the Northwest music scene, opening for such acts as Federation X, Pretty Girls Make Graves, Deadboy and the Elephantmen, Harvey Danger, and The Presidents of the United States of America.

2006 saw the release of a self-titled album by Bellingham's Clickpop Records. The Trucks played 2006's Sasquatch! Music Festival as well as New York's CMJ Festival. In 2007, The Trucks toured nationally (USA), with notable appearances at South by Southwest in Austin, and Bumbershoot in Seattle.

The Trucks' song, Shattered (from their debut album) is featured in the second episode of season five of the Showtime series The L Word (Look Out, Here They Come!). The song Zombie is featured in an advertisement for A&E's The Beast starring Patrick Swayze, and is also heard in the last trailer for Resident Evil: Afterlife. The Trucks' music is also featured on the Showtime/DreamWorks television series United States of Tara.

The Trucks announced that they would no longer be a band in October 2008, and the band played their last show on November 8, 2008, in Bellingham.

In March 2018, the band reunited to perform at the What's Up Magazine 20-year birthday celebration. They performed on Saturday, March 3 at The Wild Buffalo, a bar/venue in downtown Bellingham, with Black Eyes and Neckties, Jill Brazil, The Growers, Keaton Collective, and The Patio Kings

Discography
The Trucks, 2006,
Never Forever, 2008

References

External links
 The Trucks Homepage (no longer works).
 Clickpop Records Homepage.
 The Trucks as Artist of the Day at Spin.com.
 Review of The Trucks in the Seattle Weekly.
 Interview with Marissa Moore in Chief Magazine.

American dance music groups
Electronic music groups from Washington (state)
All-female bands